The Minneapolis Minnies were an American minor league baseball team founded in 1905 in the Kansas State League. After the 1905 season, the team ceased operations until 1908, when they reformed and joined the Central Kansas League. The team ceased operations once again after 1909, and then returned for their final season in 1912.

Notable former players include Ross Reynolds  and Harry Short.

References 

Defunct baseball teams in Kansas
Minnies
1905 establishments in Kansas
1912 disestablishments in Kansas
Baseball teams disestablished in 1912
Baseball teams established in 1905
Central Kansas League teams
Kansas State League teams